The Human Pathogens and Toxins Act (HPTA) is an Act of the Parliament of Canada, agreed in 2009 under the Harper government. The responsible Minister is the Minister of Health, and the text defines punishment under the Criminal Code of Canada. The control of security clearances is the exclusive domain of the Minister of Health; neither the RCMP nor the CSIS are mentioned anywhere in the Act. Section 7 of the Act does mention the Transportation of Dangerous Goods Act and the Export and Import Permits Act as falling outside the scope of the HPTA.


History
It came to light in June 2021 during the disgrace of Xiangguo Qiu that the Public Health Agency of Canada requires "anyone working with human pathogens and toxins" at the National Microbiology Laboratory (or elsewhere) to "have clearance under the HPTA." The CBC reporter was under the impression that another "secret level clearance" is required to work at the NML but does not disclose the name nor the controller of this additional clearance.

References

Canadian federal legislation
Health Canada
40th Canadian Parliament
Infectious diseases
Biotechnology in Canada
Environmental law in Canada